The Draughts European Championship is the championship in international draughts (international checkers), since 1965 organised by the World Draughts Federation (FMJD) and European Draughts Confederation. Since 2005 championship on blitz and from 2012 on rapid, both annually.

Classics

Rapid

Blitz

Superblitz

See also
List of women's Draughts European Championship winners

References

External links
European Draughts Confederation

Draughts competitions